Giuseppe Bagnera may refer to:
 Giuseppe Bagnera (politician)
 Giuseppe Bagnera (mathematician)